Lodgepole is a public art work by artist Lyman Kipp located at the Lynden Sculpture Garden near Milwaukee, Wisconsin. The abstract sculpture is a T-shaped form painted red; it is installed on the patio.

References

Outdoor sculptures in Milwaukee
1968 sculptures
Steel sculptures in Wisconsin
Abstract sculptures in Wisconsin
1968 establishments in Wisconsin